Srikanth Ramu (born 28 November 1988) is an Indian professional footballer who plays as a right back for Pune F.C. in the I-League.

Career
Born in Bangalore, Karnataka, Ramu joined Pune F.C. of the I-League in 2011. Ramu has been a part of the clubs squad during the clubs forays into the Federation Cup and Durand Cup. He also played for the club in the historic friendly against Premier League side Blackburn Rovers in 2011 when he came on as a late substitute.

References

External links 
 Pune Football Club Profile.

1988 births
Living people
Footballers from Bangalore
Pune FC players
Association football defenders
I-League players
Indian footballers
Mumbai FC players